A dirge is a somber song expressing mourning or grief.

Dirge may also refer to:

People
Roman Dirge (born 1972), American artist

Arts, entertainment, and media

Fictional entities
Dirge (Transformers), a character in the Transformers franchise
Dirge, a character in the Xombie franchise
The 10th Colossus in Shadow of the Colossus

Literature
Dirge (novel), by Alan Dean Foster
"A Dirge", an 1824 poem composed by Percy Bysshe Shelley
"A Dirge", an 1884 poem composed by Amy Levy

Music
Dirge (band), a French post-metal band
Dirge (album), by Wormrot
"Dirge" (Alien Faktor song)
"Dirge" (Bob Dylan song)
"Dirge", a song by Death in Vegas from The Contino Sessions